The title First Lady of Sierra Leone is held by the female spouse of the president of Sierra Leone. The first lady is a representative of the people of Sierra Leone at home and abroad. The Office of the First Lady is an extension of State House and is responsible for social events and ceremonies at State Lodge. The First Lady’s Office is not established by an act of parliament and cannot receive government funding.

Since 1971, Sierra Leone has had six first ladies. The first was Rebecca Stevens, wife of former president Siaka Stevens, who remained at her family's private residence at 1 King Harmon Road while her husband lived at State House and Kabasa Lodge.

Office of the First Lady of Sierra Leone

Sierra Leone's third first lady was one of the country's foremost lawyers Patricia Kabbah. Kabbah had been the chairperson of the committee that restored Sierra Leone to civilian rule and she helped draft the country's constitution in 1995. When her husband won the election, she sought to set up the first Office of the First Lady in the history of Sierra Leone. Her husband 0gave in to pressure from stalwarts in their political party and denied her request. Kabbah died of cancer in 1998.

Shortly after her death, her husband Ahmad Tejan Kabbah married Isata Kabbah who became the 4th first lady.

In 2007, Sia Koroma, a biochemist and psychiatric nurse, became the 5th first lady of Sierra Leone. Koroma successful established the Office of the First Lady and completely redefined the role. In addition to her representative role, she worked on three initiatives: WISH to support mothers and children, FLAXIS to provide training and the Danké Koroma Foundation.

The current first lady of Sierra Leone is Fatima Maada Bio, wife of President Julius Maada Bio who took office on April 4, 2018. Bio, an actor and film maker, has continued in the tradition of Sia Koroma and is maintaining the Office of the First Lady.

First ladies of Sierra Leone (1971–present)

References

External links
 State House Sierra Leone
 First Lady Sierra Leone

First Ladies of Sierra Leone